The Laurelhurst Manor Apartments is a building complex in southeast Portland, Oregon listed on the National Register of Historic Places.

Further reading

See also
 National Register of Historic Places listings in Southeast Portland, Oregon

References

1941 establishments in Oregon
Bungalow architecture in Oregon
Residential buildings completed in 1941
Apartment buildings on the National Register of Historic Places in Portland, Oregon
Southeast Portland, Oregon